Eva Miriam Hart MBE (31 January 1905 – 14 February 1996) was a British woman who was one of the last remaining survivors of the sinking of RMS Titanic on 15 April 1912.

Biography

Early life

Eva Hart was born on 31 January 1905 in Ilford, Essex (now part of Greater London), England, to a Jewish family. Her parents were Benjamin Hart and his wife Esther (née Bloomfield). Eva was their only child. Esther had been previously married and had nine children from her first marriage. Eva was educated at St. Mary's Convent (later St. Mary's Hare Park) in Gidea Park, London. In early 1912, Benjamin decided his family would emigrate to Winnipeg, Manitoba, Canada. He was influenced by his brother, who already lived there and economic recessions at that time in England, in his decision to emigrate.

Aboard Titanic
Eva was seven years old when she and her parents boarded Titanic as second-class passengers on April 10, 1912. They had been booked on the SS Philadelphia, but a coal strike at Southampton that spring kept her from sailing and many of her passengers were transferred to Titanic. Eva's mother allegedly felt uneasy about Titanic and feared that some catastrophe would happen; the hubris of calling a ship unsinkable was, in her mind, flying in the face of God. With such fear, Eva's mother slept only during the day and stayed awake in their cabin at night fully dressed.

Eva was sleeping when Titanic struck an iceberg at 11:40 pm on 14 April. Her mother was awake at the time and felt "a slight bump." She immediately asked her husband to investigate the disturbance and he reluctantly left the cabin. Upon his return, he alerted her and Eva to the collision and, after wrapping Eva in a blanket, he carried her to the boat deck. Eva's father placed his wife and daughter in Lifeboat No. 14 and told her to "be a good girl and hold Mummy's hand". It was the last thing he ever said to her and the last time she ever saw him; he perished in the sinking and his body, if recovered, was never identified.

Eva and her mother were rescued the following morning by the rescue ship RMS Carpathia. Soon after arriving in New York City on 18 April, Eva and her mother returned to the UK, because her mother never wanted to set sail for New York in the first place. Eva was plagued with nightmares and upon the death of her mother in 1928, when Hart was 23, she confronted her fears head-on by booking a ticket on a passenger ship heading to Singapore, upon which she locked herself in her cabin for four straight days until the nightmares went away.

In April 2012, an audio walking guide to Titanic memorials in Southampton was produced, featuring audio clips of Hart talking about her experience. The guide takes the listener on a walking route around Southampton, where Titanic set sail on her maiden voyage. Being seven years old at the time of the sinking, she maintained several vivid memories:

Career
Hart had several jobs during her life. She was a professional singer in Australia, a Conservative Party organiser, and a magistrate. As a volunteer in the Second World War, Hart organised entertainment for the troops and distributed emergency supplies to people after The Blitz. She was a member of  Soroptimist International of East London from 1962 until her death, serving as club president during 1970–71 and as a member for 34 years.

Honours
In the 1974 New Year Honours, Hart was appointed a Member of the Order of the British Empire (MBE) "for political and public services in London." It was presented to her by the Duke of Kent during the Three-Day Week.

Commentary about the disaster

Hart frequently criticised the White Star Line for failing to provide enough lifeboats for all aboard Titanic: "If a ship is torpedoed, that's war. If it strikes a rock in a storm, that's nature. But just to die because there weren't enough lifeboats, that's ridiculous." The official report of the British Inquiry suggests, however, that additional boats would not necessarily have made any difference; the crew did not properly launch all of the boats it had in the available time, and there was no boat drill and no advance information given to the crew on what should be done in the event of emergency.

Hart insisted in interviews that the ship had broken in half, a widely debated rumour that was later proven to be true after the discovery of the wreck site by Robert Ballard in 1985. She was also adamant regarding the controversy surrounding SS Californian, a ship that was only a few miles from Titanic and yet failed to respond to distress rockets and calls for help.

When salvaging efforts at the wreck site began in 1987, Hart was quick to note that Titanic was a gravesite and should be treated as such. She often decried the "insensitivity and greed" and labelled the salvagers "fortune hunters, vultures, pirates, and grave robbers." In Titanic: The Complete Story, she stated:

Later life
Hart remained active in Titanic-related activities well into her 80s. In 1982, she returned to the US and joined several other survivors at a Titanic Historical Society convention commemorating the 70th anniversary of the sinking. She participated in three more conventions in 1987, 1988, and in 1992. In 1994, she wrote an autobiography, Shadow of the Titanic – A Survivor's Story, in which she described her experiences aboard the ship and the lasting implications of its sinking. On 15 April 1995, the 83rd anniversary of the disaster, she and fellow second-class Titanic survivor Edith Brown dedicated a memorial garden plaque on the grounds of the National Maritime Museum in London.

Death
Hart died from cancer on 14 February 1996 in a hospice in London, two weeks after her 91st birthday. Her death left eight remaining survivors. In her memory, a Wetherspoon's pub in Chadwell Heath is named 'The Eva Hart'.

Popular culture
Hart's connection to the Titanic and her active involvement in later years made her popular in numerous forms of media, including mentions in non-fiction books, museums and exhibitions.
 Several Titanic documentaries, including Titanica in 1995, feature interviews with Hart.
 Shadow of the Titanic, published by Chadwell Publishers in 1994, is the biography of Hart written by Professor Ronald C. Denney in collaboration with her. Various republications have been released since its first publication, with minor changes.
 Eva and Little Kitty on the Titanic, is a children's book published by Sidsel Media in 2012, based on Hart's account of the disaster.
 James Cameron's 1997 film Titanic features a scene where a father says to his daughter, "You hold Mommy's hand and be a good little girl"; this is a reference to Hart's father, Benjamin, who spoke similar words the night of the disaster, when she was put into a lifeboat. An interview with her was also included in a behind-the-scenes documentary about the 1997 film.

References

External links

 https://www.encyclopedia-titanica.org/titanic-survivor/eva-hart.html?_escaped_fragment_=comment=1514

RMS Titanic's crew and passengers
1905 births
1996 deaths
British Jews
Deaths from cancer in England
Members of the Order of the British Empire
People from Ilford
RMS Titanic survivors
People from Chadwell Heath
English autobiographers